Allen Chapman (born August 18, 1974) is an American soccer referee and member of PRO. He lives in Utah.

Chapman regularly referees matches for Major League Soccer, and has done so since 2012.

During an August 2016 USL match in New Jersey, Chapman became the first video assistant referee to be used during a professional match.

Chapman is also a former player and coach. He played professionally for the Arizona Sahuaros between 2000 and 2002.

Card statistics

References

External links
  (archive)
 

1974 births
Living people
American soccer referees
Sportspeople from Arizona
Major League Soccer referees
North American Soccer League referees
USL Second Division players
Association footballers not categorized by position
Association football players not categorized by nationality